Covington High School is the name of several high schools in the United States:

Covington High School (Covington, Indiana)
Covington High School (Covington, Louisiana)
Covington High School (Covington, Ohio)
Covington High School (Covington, Tennessee)
Covington High School (Covington, Virginia)
Covington Catholic High School (Park Hills, Kentucky)

See also
Holmes Junior/Senior High School (Covington, Kentucky), originally Covington Central High